F. californica  may refer to:
 Festuca californica, the California fescue, a grass species native to California and Oregon
 Fremontia californica, a synonym for Fremontodendron californicum, the California flannelbush, a flowering evergreen shrub species

See also
 List of Latin and Greek words commonly used in systematic names#C